Henry II (Dutch: Hendrik, French: Henri) was the Count of Louvain (Leuven) from 1054 through 1071 (?). Henry II was the son of Lambert II, Count of Louvain and Oda of Verdun. His maternal uncles included Pope Stephen IX and Duke Godfrey the Bearded of Lorraine.

Marriage and issue
Henry married Adela of Thuringa. Henry and Adela had several sons and a daughter: 
 Henry III, Count of Louvain  (d. 1095). He married Gertrude of Flanders (1080–1117), daughter of Robert I of Flanders and Gertrude of Saxony. They probably bore duchess Adelaide wife of Simon I of Lorraine, and countess Gertrude wife to Lambert, count of Montaigu and Clermont.
 Godfrey I, Count of Louvain  (1060–1139). He married Ida de Chiny & Namur, who bore at least five children e.g. Godfrey II of Louvain, Duke of Lower Lorraine. later he married Clementia of Burgundy and bore Joceline of Louvain. 
 Albero I of Louvain, Bishop of Liège 
 Ida of Louvain, who married Baldwin II, Count of Hainaut.

Ancestry

See also
Dukes of Brabant family tree
 Chronique des Ducs de Brabant, Adrian van Baerland, Antwerp (1612).

References

House of Reginar
Counts of Louvain
11th-century people of the Holy Roman Empire
1020s births
1071 deaths
Year of birth uncertain